In the Bag (also released as The Adderley Brothers in New Orleans) is an album by jazz cornetist Nat Adderley released on the Jazzland label featuring performances by Adderley with his brother Cannonball Adderley, Sam Jones,  Nat Perrilliat, James Black, and Ellis Marsalis.

Reception
The Allmusic review by Scott Yanow awarded the album 2 stars stating "The repertoire they perform is quite fresh but there is less excitement than one might hope and the musicians do not really form a unified group sound despite some strong individual moments". The Penguin Guide to Jazz awarded the album 3 stars stating "In the Bag is welcome for a further glimpse of the brothers playing together but isn't specially exciting".

Track listing
All compositions by Nat Adderley except as indicated
 "In the Bag" - 6:23
 "Sister Wilson" (James N. Black) - 3:20
 "R.S.V.P." (Nat Adderley, Ellis Marsalis) - 3:58
 "Low Brown" (Yusef Salim) - 4:42
 "Mozart-In'" (Alvin Batiste) - 6:32
 "New Arrival" (Black) - 5:35
 "Chatterbox" (Batiste) - 6:36
 "The Popeye" - 1:56 Bonus track on CD
 "The Gospel Truth" - 2:24  Bonus track on CD
Recorded in New Orleans on May 19, 1962

Personnel
Nat Adderley – cornet
Cannonball Adderley - alto saxophone
Nat Perrilliat - tenor saxophone
Ellis Marsalis - piano
Sam Jones - bass
James N. Black - drums

References

1962 albums
Jazzland Records albums
Nat Adderley albums